Villa Cura Brochero is a City in  Córdoba Province in Argentina. It is the capital of the San Alberto Department.

External links

 official web site

Populated places in Córdoba Province, Argentina
Cities in Argentina
Argentina
Córdoba Province, Argentina